Route 945 is a Canadian highway in Westmorland County, New Brunswick.

The  road runs from an intersection with Route 933 at Haute Aboujagane in the west to an intersection with Route 133 in Cap-Pelé in the east.

Communities along Route 945
Haute Aboujagane
Cormier Village
Saint-André-de-Shediac
Cap-Pelé

See also
List of New Brunswick provincial highways

References

 New Brunswick Atlas, 2nd Edition

New Brunswick provincial highways
Roads in Westmorland County, New Brunswick